Douglas Barr (born May 1, 1949), also credited as Doug Barr, is an American actor, writer, and director. He has starred in movies and on television.

Barr was born in Cedar Rapids, Iowa. His big role came in the ABC TV series The Fall Guy as Howie Munson from 1981 to 1986. Barr then made some guest appearances on series such as Fantasy Island, The Love Boat, Hotel, and Murder, She Wrote. His other well-known role was in the short-lived CBS TV series The Wizard as Alex Jagger from 1986 to 1987, and he later starred  as Bill Stillfield in the hit CBS series Designing Women from 1988 to 1991.

The first feature film in which he starred was the horror movie Deadly Blessing (1981). He also starred in The Unseen, another horror movie. His last film role was in the erotic film Temptation (1994). He went on to direct numerous TV movies.

In 1998, Barr started Hollywood and Vine Cellars, a small, high-end wine producer in Napa Valley.

Filmography

Actor

Director

External links
 
 
 Like a Fine Wine
 The Wizard Official fansite

1949 births
Living people
American male film actors
American male television actors
American television directors
Male actors from Iowa
Actors from Cedar Rapids, Iowa
Writers from Cedar Rapids, Iowa